Dejan Bogunović (born 13 May 1981) is a Serbian former professional footballer who played as a goalkeeper. He is the older brother of fellow footballer Saša Bogunović.

Club career
Bogunović started out at his hometown club Novi Sad, before transferring to Vojvodina in the summer of 1998. He returned to Novi Sad after three years, making close to 150 appearances in the second tier between 2001 and 2005.

International career
In 2002, Bogunović was capped for FR Yugoslavia at under-21 level, coming on as a substitute for Nenad Erić in a friendly loss to France U21.

References

External links
 
 
 

Association football goalkeepers
Expatriate soccer players in South Africa
First League of Serbia and Montenegro players
FK Banat Zrenjanin players
FK Kabel players
FK Metalac Gornji Milanovac players
RFK Novi Sad 1921 players
FK Proleter Novi Sad players
FK Vojvodina players
Maritzburg United F.C. players
OFK Bačka players
Serbia and Montenegro footballers
Serbia and Montenegro under-21 international footballers
Serbian expatriate footballers
Serbian expatriate sportspeople in South Africa
Serbian First League players
Serbian footballers
Serbian SuperLiga players
South African Premier Division players
Footballers from Novi Sad
1981 births
Living people